Janet Todd (born December 12, 1985), nicknamed "JT", is an American Muay Thai kickboxer. She is a two-time Pan-American Muay Thai Champion and trains out of Boxing Works. Currently, she competes for ONE Championship and is the reigning ONE Kickboxing Atomweight World Champion.

As of January 2022, she is ranked as the ninth best pound for pound female kickboxer in the world by Combat Press.

Background 
Todd was born in Hermosa Beach, California. Although born in the United States, her first spoken language was Japanese, taught by her mother. In her youth, Todd trained and competed in gymnastics, but later gave up the pursuit due to wanting a balance with her personal life.

Todd attended California Polytechnic State University in San Luis Obispo and completed a five-year master's program in aerospace engineering.

After beginning kickboxing classes, Todd's then boyfriend, now husband, introduced her to a Muay Thai gym.

Muay Thai career 
Todd first competed as an amateur in 2009. She won the bout by TKO but did not return to competition until 2013.

In 2017, Todd captured the bronze medal at the IFMA World Championships and World Games, subsequently winning an IFMA Pan-American Championship. She later won gold at the 2017 IFMA Pan American Championships at 51 kg.

ONE Championship 
On February 22, 2019, Todd joined ONE Championship to compete for the ONE Atomweight Muay Thai world title against Stamp Fairtex. She lost by unanimous decision.

She returned to ONE Championship on May 10, 2019, under kickboxing rules, defeating Wang Chin Long by TKO in the second round.

On July 12, 2019, in another kickboxing match, Todd defeated Chuang Kai Ting by majority decision at ONE Championship: Masters of Destiny.

On October 13, 2019, fighting under Muay Thai rules, she defeated Ekaterina Vandaryeva by second-round knockout at ONE Championship: Century.

ONE Kickboxing Atomweight champion
She faced Stamp Fairtex a second time, fighting for the ONE Women's Atomweight Kickboxing World Championship, at ONE: King of the Jungle on February 28, 2020, winning by split decision.

Todd faced former ONE Atomweight Muay Thai title challenger Alma Juniku in a non-title Muay Thai match at ONE: Fists Of Fury 3 on March 19, 2021. She defeated Juniku by unanimous decision, scoring a knockdown in the second round.

Todd faced Anne Line Hogstad at ONE on TNT 2 on April 14, 2021. She won via a body kick that dropped Hogstad in the third round.

Todd faced promotional newcomer Lara Fernandez for the interim ONE Women's Atomweight Muay Thai World Championship at ONE 159 on July 22, 2022. She won the fight by unanimous decision.

Todd was scheduled to face Allycia Rodrigues in a ONE Women's Atomweight Muay Thai World Championship unification bout at ONE on Prime Video 5 on December 3, 2022. She withdrew from the fight on November 30, after testing positive for COVID-19. The pair was rescheduled on March 25, 2023, at ONE Fight Night 8.

Championships and accomplishments 
Professional
ONE Championship
 ONE Women's Atomweight Kickboxing World Championship (One time; current)
 interim ONE Women's Atomweight Muay Thai World Championship (One time; current)
 ONE Super Series Female Fighter of the Year 2021 

Amateur
International Federation of Muaythai Associations
 2017 IFMA World Championships -51 kg 
 2017 IFMA Pan-American Championships -51 kg  
 2016 IFMA Pan-American Championships 
World Games
 2017 World Games Muay Thai -51 kg 
US Muay Thai Open
 2017 USMTO 112 lbs Tournament Champion
Thai Boxing Association-Sanctioning Authority
 2016 TBA-SA Muay Thai Classic A-Class 112 lbs Champion
International Amateur Muay Thai Federation
 2015 IAMTF Amateur 115 lbs Champion 
 2014 IAMTF California Amateur Super Flyweight Champion
Muay Thai Association of America
 2015 MTAA Amateur 115 lbs Champion
United States Muay Thai Association
 2013 USMTA Amateur 120 lbs Champion

Muay Thai & Kickboxing record 

|-  style="background:#;"
| 2023-03-25 || ||align=left| Allycia Rodrigues || ONE Fight Night 8 || Kallang, Singapore ||  ||  || 
|-
! style=background:white colspan=9 |
|-
|-  style="background:#CCFFCC;"
| 2022-07-22|| Win ||align=left| Lara Fernandez|| ONE 159: De Ridder vs. Bigdash || Kallang, Singapore || Decision (Unanimous) || 5 || 3:00 
|-
! style=background:white colspan=9 |
|-
|-  style="background:#CCFFCC;"
| 2021-04-14|| Win ||align=left| Anne Line Hogstad|| ONE on TNT 2 || Kallang, Singapore || TKO (Body kick) || 3 || 1:36 
|-
|-  style="background:#CCFFCC;"
| 2021-03-19|| Win ||align=left| Alma Juniku || ONE Championship: Fists Of Fury 3 || Kallang, Singapore || Decision (Unanimous)|| 3 || 3:00
|-
|-  style="background:#CCFFCC;"
| 2020-02-28|| Win ||align=left| Stamp Fairtex || ONE Championship: King of the Jungle || Kallang, Singapore || Decision (Split)|| 5 || 3:00
|-
! style=background:white colspan=9 |
|-  style="background:#CCFFCC;"
| 2019-10-13|| Win ||align=left| Ekaterina Vandaryeva || ONE Championship: Century || Tokyo, Japan || KO (Head kick) || 2 ||2:20 
|-
|-  style="background:#CCFFCC;"
| 2019-07-12|| Win ||align=left| Kai Ting Chuang || ONE Championship: Masters of Destiny || Kuala Lumpur, Malaysia || Decision (Majority) || 3 ||3:00 
|-
|-  style="background:#CCFFCC;"
| 2019-05-10|| Win ||align=left| Wang Chin Long || ONE Championship: Warriors of Light || Bangkok, Thailand || TKO (3 Knockdown Rule) || 2 || 2:59
|-
|-  style="background:#FFBBBB;"
| 2019-02-22|| Loss ||align=left| Stamp Fairtex || ONE Championship: Call to Greatness || Kallang, Singapore || Decision (Unanimous)|| 5 || 3:00
|-
! style=background:white colspan=9 |
|-  style="background:#FFBBBB;"
| 2018-02-25|| Loss ||align=left| Yumiko Kawano || Triumphant 3 || Oakland, California || Decision (Split) || 3 || 3:00
|-
| colspan=9 | Legend:     

|-  style="background:#fbb;"
| 2018-05-15|| Loss ||align=left| Josefine Lindgren Knutsson || 2018 IFMA World Championships, Quarter Finals || Cancun, Mexico || Decision (30:27)|| 3 || 2:00
|-  style="background:#cfc;"
| 2017-11-05|| Win||align=left| Anne Lieberman || US Muay Thai Open East, Tournament Final || New York, United States || Decision || 3 || 3:00
|-
! style=background:white colspan=9 |
|-  style="background:#cfc;"
| 2017-11-04|| Win||align=left| Mary Brulatour  || US Muay Thai Open East, Tournament Semifinal || New York, United States || Decision || 3 || 3:00
|-
|-  style="background:#cfc;"
| 2017-11-04|| Win||align=left| Yasmeen Salhani  || US Muay Thai Open East, Tournament Quarterfinal || New York, United States || Decision || 3 || 3:00
|-  style="background:#cfc;"
| 2017-10-07|| Win||align=left| Valeria Ramirez Sanchez  || IFMA Pan American Championships, Tournament Final || Buenos Aires, Argentina|| Decision || 3 || 3:00
|-
! style=background:white colspan=9 |
|-  style="background:#cfc;"
| 2017-10-07|| Win||align=left| Paula Luna || IFMA Pan American Championships, Tournament Semifinal || Buenos Aires, Argentina|| Decision || 3 || 3:00
|-

|-  style="background:#cfc;"
| 2017-07-30|| Win||align=left| Gabriela Kuzawińska	  || 2017 World Games, Bronze Medal Fight || Wroclaw, Poland || TKO|| 3 || 
|-
! style=background:white colspan=9 |
|-  style="background:#fbb;"
| 2017-07-29|| Loss||align=left| Apasara Koson || 2017 World Games, Semi Finals || Wroclaw, Poland || Decision (30:27)|| 3 || 2:00
|-  style="background:#cfc;"
| 2017-07-28|| Win||align=left| Meriem El Moubarik  || 2017 World Games, Quarter Finals || Wroclaw, Poland || Decision (29:28)|| 3 || 2:00
|-  style="background:#cfc;"
| 2017-05-27|| Win||align=left| Kennedy Maze || WBC Muay Thai Tournament, Tournament Final || Tacoma, Washington, United States || TKO || 2 || 
|-
! style=background:white colspan=9 |
|-  style="background:#cfc;"
| 2017-05-27|| Win||align=left| Chelsea Elexis Van || WBC Muay Thai Tournament, Tournament Semifinal || Tacoma, Washington, United States || Decision || 3 || 3:00
|-
|-  style="background:#fbb;"
| 2017-05-07|| Loss ||align=left| Meriem El Moubarik  || 2017 IFMA World Championships, Semi Finals || Minsk, Belarus || Decision (30:27)|| 3 || 2:00
|-
! style=background:white colspan=9 |
|-  style="background:#cfc;"
| 2017-05-06|| Win ||align=left| Ekaterina Gurina || 2017 IFMA World Championships, Quarter Finals|| Minsk, Belarus || Decision (30:27)|| 3 || 2:00
|-  style="background:#fbb;"
| 2017-03-11|| Loss ||align=left| Yumiko Kawano || SHEfights: Be Bold for Change || Ontario, Canada || Decision (Unanimous)|| 3 || 2:00
|-  style="background:#cfc;"
| 2016-12-03|| Win ||align=left| Marlene de la Cuadra || 2016 IFMA Pan-Am Championships, Bronze medal match  || Lima, Peru || Decision || 3 || 2:00
|-
! style=background:white colspan=9 |
|-  style="background:#fbb;"
| 2016-12-01|| Loss ||align=left| Tristana Tola|| 2016 IFMA Pan-Am Championships, Tournament Semifinal|| Lima, Peru || Decision || 3 || 2:00
|-
|-  style="background:#cfc;"
| 2016-10-21|| Win ||align=left| Susan Wallace || Lion Fight 32: Sasiprapa vs Nattawut || Las Vegas, Nevada, United States || Decision (Unanimous) || 3 || 2:00
|-
|-  style="background:#cfc;"
| 2016-09-02 || Win ||align=left| Valeria Ramirez Sanchez  || Siam Fight Productions || Phoenix, Arizona, United States || TKO || 3 || 
|-
|-  style="background:#cfc;"
| 2016-06-19 || Win||align=left| Deepy Sidhu || TBA-SA Muay Thai Classic || Des Moines, Iowa, United States || Decision || 3 || 3:00
|-
! style=background:white colspan=9 |
|-  style="background:#cfc;"
| 2016-05-21 || Win||align=left| Thai-Ngan Le || IFS || Anaheim, California, United States || Decision || 3 || 3:00
|-
! style=background:white colspan=9 |
|-  style="background:#cfc;"
| 2016-04-24|| Win||align=left| Angela Bahr  || US Muay Thai Open, Tournament Final || Phoenix, Arizona, United States || Decision || 3 || 3:00
|-
! style=background:white colspan=9 |
|-  style="background:#cfc;"
| 2016-04-23|| Win||align=left| Yuko Shimoda || US Muay Thai Open, Tournament Semifinal || Phoenix, Arizona, United States || Decision || 3 || 3:00
|-
|-  style="background:#cfc;"
| 2015-12-12|| Win||align=left| Victoria Engberson || MTAA || Los Angeles, California, United States || TKO|| 4 || 
|-
! style=background:white colspan=9 |
|-  style="background:#cfc;"
| 2015-10-24 || Win||align=left| Krystal Khorge || WCK Muay Thai: Cali 11 Bad to the Bone || Inglewood, California, United States || Decision (Unanimous) || 5 || 3:00
|-
! style=background:white colspan=9 |
|-  style="background:#fbb;"
| 2015-08-|| Loss||align=left| Kristan Armstrong || 2015 IFMA Royal World Cup, Quarter Finals || Bangkok, Thailand || Decision || 3 || 2:00
|-  style="background:#cfc;"
| 2015-08-|| Win ||align=left| Barbara Bontempi   || 2015 IFMA Royal World Cup, Round of 16 || Bangkok, Thailand || Decision || 3 || 2:00
|-
|-  style="background:#cfc;"
| 2015-05-16 || Win||align=left| Sheila Adamos || Cali 8 || Inglewood, California, United States || Decision (Unanimous) || 5 || 3:00
|-
! style=background:white colspan=9 |
|-  style="background:#fbb;"
| 2015-03-07|| Loss||align=left| Natalie Morgan  || IFS 17 || La Puente, California, United States || Decision (Split) || 3 || 2:00
|-
! style=background:white colspan=9 |
|-
|-  style="background:#cfc;"
| 2014-08-16|| Win ||align=left| Marie Choi || Cali 5 || Inglewood, California, United States || Decision (Unanimous) || 4 || 
|-
! style=background:white colspan=9 |
|-  style="background:#fbb;"
| 2014-04-19 || Loss||align=left| Ariana Gomez || Cali 4 || Inglewood, California, United States || Decision (Unanimous) || 3 || 
|-
|-  style="background:#cfc;"
| 2014-03-28 || Win ||align=left| Renee Rosas || Lion Fight 14 || Las Vegas, Nevada, United States || Decision (Split) || 3 || 
|-
|-  style="background:#fbb;"
| 2013-12-? || Loss ||align=left| Natalie Morgan || WCK Cali Three || Los Angeles, California, United States || Decision (Unanimous) || 3 || 2:00
|-
|-  style="background:#cfc;"
| 2013-10-19 || Win ||align=left| Renee Rosas || Muay Thai Ultimate II || California, United States || Points || 5 || 2:00
|-
! style=background:white colspan=9 |
|-  style="background:#cfc;"
| 2009-07-18 || Win ||align=left| Victoria Beltran ||  || Anaheim, California, United States || TKO || 2 || 
|-
| colspan=9 | Legend:

See also 

 List of current ONE fighters

References

External links 

 Janet Todd at ONE Championship

1985 births
Living people
Female kickboxers
Flyweight kickboxers
American female kickboxers
American Muay Thai practitioners
Kickboxers from California
Female Muay Thai practitioners
People from Hermosa Beach, California
American sportspeople of Japanese descent
World Games bronze medalists
ONE Championship kickboxers
21st-century American women
Kickboxing champions
ONE Championship champions